This is a list of women artists who were born in or are closely associated with Scotland.

A
Janet Macdonald Aitken (1873–1941), painter
Ann Dunlop Alexander (1896–1969), painter, illustrator 
Lena Alexander (1899–1983), painter
Jessie Algie (1859–1927), flower painter
Mary Parsons Reid Allan (1917–2002), painter
Marion Ancrum (fl. 1885–1919), painter
Anne Anderson (1874–1952), illustrator
Louise Gibson Annand (1915–2012), painter, filmmaker
Hazel Armour (1894–1985), sculptor, medallist
Mary Nicol Neill Armour (1902–2000), painter
Annie R. Merrylees Arnold (fl. 1890s–1930s), miniature painter
Susan Ashworth (fl. 1860–1880), painter
Joan Ayling (1907–1993), miniature painter

B
Isabel Brodie Babianska (1920–2006), painter, costume designer, set designer, illustrator
Barbara Balmer (1929–2017), painter
Elizabeth Balneaves (1911–2006), painter, writer, filmmaker
Violet Banks (1896–1985), painter
Claire Barclay (born 1968), installation artist, printmaker, sculptor
Wilhelmina Barns-Graham (1912–2004), abstract painter
Mardi Barrie (1930–2004), painter
Johanna Basford (born 1983), illustrator
Penelope Beaton (1886–1963), painter 
Katherine Arthur Behenna (1860–1924), U.S.-based portrait artist
Christine Berrie, illustrator
Anne Bevan (born 1965), visual artist, sculptor
Helen Biggar (1909–1953), sculptor
Ann Spence Black (1861–1947), painter
Karla Black (born 1972), sculptor
Elizabeth Blackadder (1931–2021), painter, printmaker
Jemima Blackburn (1823–1909), painter, illustrator
Elizabeth Blackwell (1707–1758), botanical illustrator
Yvonne Boag (born 1954), painter
Phyllis Bone (1894–1972), sculptor
Christine Borland (born 1965), medical-themed contemporary artist
Mary Bright (1956–2002), Scottish curtain designer
Julie Brook (born 1961), sculptor, painter, installation artist
Helen Paxton Brown (1876–1956), painter, embroiderer
Margaret Oliver Brown (1912–1990), painter, illustrator
Elizabeth York Brunton (1880–c.1960), painter, printmaker
Mary Rose Hill Burton (1857–1900), painter
Nancy Jane Burton (1891–1972), painter

C
Joyce W. Cairns (born 1947), painter
Katharine Cameron (1874–1965), landscape painter
Mary Cameron (1865–1921), painter
Liza Campbell (born 1959), engraver, calligrapher, writer
Evelyn Carslaw (1881–1968), landscape painter
Gayle Chong Kwan (born 1973), photographer, installation artist, video artist
Margery Clinton (1931–2005), ceramist, glass artist
Gertrude Mary Coventry (1886–1964), portrait painter
Jean Hunter Cowan (1882–1967), sculptor, painter

D
Claire Dalby (born 1944), painter, illustrator
Anne Davidson (1937–2008), sculptor
Majel Davidson (1885–1969), potter, painter
Mary C. Davidson (1865–1951), painter
Mabel Dawson (1887–1965), painter 
Stansmore Dean Stevenson (1866–1944), painter
Helen Denerley (born 1956), sculptor
Marion Deuchars (born 1964), illustrator, writer
de Courcy Lewthwaite Dewar (1878–1959), enamelist, metalworker
Jessie Alexandra Dick (1896–1976), painter, teacher
Isobelle Ann Dods-Withers (1876–1939), painter
Jacqueline Donachie (born 1969), photographer, sculptor, installation artist
Kaye Donachie (born 1970), painter
Kate Downie (born 1958), American-born painter, printmaker
Jean Duncan (1933–2018), painter, printmaker

E
Joan Eardley (1921–1963), painter
Marjorie Evans (c.1850–1907), painter

F
Christian Jane Fergusson (1876–1957), painter
Margaret Cross Primrose Findlay (1902–1968), sculptor and modeller
Anne Finlay (1898–1963), painter
Beth Fisher (born 1944), American-born print artist based in Scotland
Anne Forbes (1745–1834), portrait painter
Nikki Forrest (born 1964), Canadian-based illustrator, installation artist, sound artist
Rose Frain, painter, sculptor, installation artist
Hannah Frank (1908–2008), sculptor
Jo Fraser (born 1986), painter
Annie French (1873–1965), painter, engraver, illustrator, designer

G
Floris Gillespie (1882–1967), painter
Janetta Gillespie (1876–1956), painter
Margaret Gillies (1803–1887), painter
Henrietta Gilmour (1852–1926), Canadian-born photographer
Constance Gordon-Cumming (1837–1924), painter, writer
Mary Grant (1831–1908), sculptor
Norah Neilson Gray (1882–1931), painter

H
Maggie Hamilton (1867–1952), painter
Gwen Hardie (born 1962), painter
Claire Harrigan (born 1964), painter
Josephine Haswell Miller (1890–1975), painter
Mairi Hedderwick (born 1939), illustrator, writer
Ann Henderson (1921–1976), sculptor
Mary Balfour Herbert (1817–1893), watercolour painter
Amelia Robertson Hill (1821–1904), sculptor
Gwynneth Holt (1909–1995), sculptor
Louise Hopkins (born 1965), English-born painter, printmaker
Anna Hotchkis (1885–1984), painter, writer
Beatrice Huntington (1889–1998), painter, sculptor, musician
Moira Huntly (born 1932), painter

I
Esther Inglis (1571–1624), painter, calligrapher, embroiderer, writer

J
Dorothy Johnstone (1892–1980), painter

K
Violet McNeish Kay (1914–1971), landscape painter 
Jeka Kemp (1876–1966), painter
Jessie Keppie (1868–1951), watercolour painter
Annabel Kidston (1896–1981), etcher, painter 
Anna King (born 1984), landscape painter
Jessie M. King (1875–1949), illustrator, jewellery designer, fashion designer
Lady Caroline Kininmonth (1907–1978), painter

L
Annie Rose Laing (1869–1946), painter
Elspeth Lamb (born 1951), printmaker
Eileen Lawrence (born 1946), painter, printmaker
Bet Low (1924–2007), painter

M
Ann Macbeth (1875–1948), English-born embroiderer
Frances MacDonald (1873–1921), painter, embroiderer, illustrator, textile artist
Shona Macdonald (born 1969), contemporary artist
Margaret Macdonald Mackintosh (1865–1933), painter, designer
Esther Blaikie MacKinnon (1885–1934), painter, engraver
Chica Macnab (1889–1980), painter, engraver
Bessie MacNicol (1869–1904), painter
Jessie M. McGeehan (1872–1950), painter
Alison McKenzie (1907–1982), painter, printmaker 
Lucy McKenzie (born 1977), painter
Abigail McLellan (1969–2009), painter
Mary McMurtrie (1902–2003), botanical artist
Caroline McNairn (1955–2010), painter
Margaret Mellis (1914–2009), Chinese-born painter
Grace Wilson Melvin (c.1882–1977), artist, teacher
Catriona Millar (born 1956), painter
Agnes Miller Parker (1895–1980), engraver, illustrator
Victoria Morton (born 1971), painter, sculptor
Sheila Mullen (born 1942), painter

N
Mary Nimmo Moran (1822–1899), U.S.-based landscape artist, engraver
Anne Nasmyth (1798–1874), Scottish landscape artist
Barbara Nasmyth (1790–1870), Scottish landscape artist
Charlotte Nasmyth (1804–1884), Scottish landscape artist
Jane Nasmyth (1788–1867), Scottish landscape artist
Jessie Newbery (1864–1948), embroiderer, textile artist

O
Elizabeth Ogilvie (born 1946), sculptor, environmental artist

P
Aileen Paterson (1934–2018), illustrator, writer
Emily Murray Paterson (1855–1934), painter
Katie Paterson (born 1981), mixed media artist
Viola Paterson (1899–1981), painter and woodcut printer
Deborah Phillips (born 1965), painter
Susan Philipsz (born 1965), sound artist, installation artist
Mabel Pryde (1871–1918), painter
Della Purves (1945–2008), botanical artist

R
Barbara Rae (born 1943), painter, printmaker
Arabella Rankin (1871–c.1935), printmaker
Catherine Read (1723–1778), portrait painter
Anne Redpath (1895–1965), painter
Christina Robertson (1796–1854), Russian court painter

S
Concordia Scott (1924–2014), sculptor, nun
Elaine Shemilt (born 1954), printmaker, video artist, photographer
Lucy Skaer (born 1975), sculptor, painter, filmmaker
Dorothy Carleton Smyth (1880–1933), painter, stained glass artist, costume designer
Pamela So (1947–2010), multimedia artist, photographer
Helen Stevenson (fl. 1920–1935), printmaker
Grace Campbell Stewart (died 1863), miniature painter
Maud Sulter (1960–2008), photographer, writer
Jean Sutherland (1907–2006), photographer, songwriter, poet

T
Helen Monro Turner (1901–1977), woodcut and stained glass artist

W
Ethel Walker (1861–1951), painter
Ottilie Maclaren Wallace (1875–1947), sculptor
Cecile Walton (1891–1956), painter, illustrator, sculptor
Alison Watt (born 1965), painter
Margaret Bruce Wells (1909–1998), printmaker
Mary Georgina Wade Wilson (1856–1939), painter
Sylvia Wishart (1936–2008), landscape artist

Y
Jane Younger (1863–1955), painter

Z
Anna Zinkeisen (1901–1976), painter
Doris Zinkeisen (1898–1991), painter

-
Scottish
Artists, List of Scottish women
Artists, women
Scottish